The 1905 All-Ireland Senior Football Championship was the 19th staging of Ireland's premier Gaelic football knock-out competition. Kildare were the winners ended 2 years of Kerry in the All Ireland final.

Format
The four provincial championships were played as usual; the four champions joined  in the All-Ireland Championship.

Results

Connacht Senior Football Championship

Leinster Senior Football Championship

An objection was made and a replay ordered.

Munster Senior Football Championship

Ulster Senior Football Championship

All-Ireland Senior Football Championship

As the Leinster Championship was not finished by the time London was supposed to play their quarter-final, Dublin was nominated to face them. When Kildare won the Leinster Championship, they were deemed to have defeated London.

Championship statistics

Miscellaneous

 Roscommon are Connacht champions for the first time.
 Kildare are All Ireland champions for the first time.

References